Mirko Srdić (born 26 February 1962), better known by his stage name Elvis J. Kurtović, is a Bosnian rock and roll musician, actor, comedian, and music editor. He is  most notable as the bandleader and co-founder of the Yugoslav punk rock band Elvis J. Kurtović & His Meteors. He was one of the founders of the New Primitivism movement in his hometown Sarajevo. As an actor, he has been featured in the Top lista nadrealista and the Nadreality Show.

Career 
Kurtović was born in Sarajevo, SR Bosnia and Herzegovina, SFR Yugoslavia (present-day Bosnia and Herzegovina) where he finished elementary school and the 2nd Sarajevo Gymnasium. He earned his degree in civil engineering from the University of Sarajevo.

In 1981, Kurtović with Dražen Janković and Sejo Sexon established a punk rock band Elvis J. Kurtović & His Meteors. He has contributed on all Elvis J. Kurtović & His Meteors releases; Mitovi i legende o kralju Elvisu (1984), Da bog da crk'o rok'n'rol (1985), and The Wonderful World of Private Business (1988).

In 1996, Kurtović accompanied Sejo Sexon, Predrag Bobić, and Samir Ćeramida, with whom he restarted the band Zabranjeno Pušenje, disbanded in the early 1990s. He performed on their two studio albums; Fildžan viška (1997) and Agent tajne sile (1999).

Discography 
Elvis J. Kurtović & His Meteors
Mitovi i legende o kralju Elvisu (1984)
Da bog da crk'o rok'n'rol (1985)
The Wonderful World of Private Business (1988)

Zabranjeno pušenje
 Fildžan viška (1996)
 Hapsi sve! (1998)
 Agent tajne sile (1999)

Filmography

References

External links
  
 Elvis J. Kurtović on Discogs
 

1962 births
Living people
20th-century Bosnia and Herzegovina male singers
Bosnia and Herzegovina male television actors
Bosnia and Herzegovina rock singers
Serbs of Bosnia and Herzegovina
Musicians from Sarajevo
Punk rock singers
Rock songwriters
Zabranjeno pušenje members
Yugoslav male singers
21st-century Bosnia and Herzegovina male singers
Bosnia and Herzegovina humorists
New Primitivism people
University of Sarajevo alumni